A post-game, postgame, or post-match show is a TV or radio presentation that occurs immediately after the live broadcast of a major sporting event.
Contents may include:
 replays of key moments in the game.
 interviews with players, coaches and managers.
 analysis of the game by sports commentators.
 footage of celebrating or demoralized fans.
 previews of the next game or series.
 championship and/or MVP trophy presentations.

Postgame shows are generally shorter and less structured than pre-game shows, especially for national broadcasts. In many cases, especially in prime time matchups, there may be virtually no post-game show at all. This is partially due to the unpredictability of the length of a typical sporting event, which can vary in length by a considerable amount depending on clock stoppages and overtime. The post-game show is expected to fill the gap between the end of the game and the start of regularly scheduled programming. A team's success may also portend whether a post-game show is detailed or merely a summary of the box score and highlights.

See also
 Pre-game show
 Halftime show
 Aftershow

Terminology used in multiple sports